The Squash - Single Women competition at the World Games 2009 took place from July 21 to July 24 at the Chung Cheng Martial Arts Stadium in Kaohsiung, Taiwan.

Seeds

Draw

Note: * w/d = Withdraw, * w/o = Walkover, * r = Retired

References

Women
Squash records and statistics
2009 in women's squash